The Toyman is the name of three supervillains and one adolescent superhero appearing in comic books published by DC Comics, mostly as an adversary for Superman.

The most well-known incarnation of the Toyman is Winslow Percival Schott, a criminal who uses toy-based or toy-themed devices and gimmicks in his various crimes. The Toyman made frequent appearances in the Golden Age comics, but has appeared infrequently in Superman stories since then. In the succeeding years, Jack Nimball briefly took up the mantle after Schott retired while Hiro Okamura uses the name while operating as a superhero despite Schott coming out of retirement by then.

Schott, Nimball, and Okamura have made several appearances in DC-related media, with Schott appearing in television series set in the DC Animated Universe, in which he is voiced by Bud Cort, and the live-action television series Smallville, portrayed by Chris Gauthier. Additionally, Schott along with his son and series original character Winslow "Winn" Schott Jr. appear in the live-action Arrowverse television series Supergirl, portrayed by Henry Czerny and Jeremy Jordan respectively.

Publication history
The Winslow Percival Schott version of the Toyman first appeared in Action Comics #64 (September 1943) and was created by Don Cameron and Ed Dobrotka.

The Jack Nimball version of the Toyman first appeared in Action Comics #432 and was created by Cary Bates and Curt Swan.

The Hiro Okamura version of the Toyman first appeared in Superman (vol. 2) #127 and was created by Jeph Loeb and Ed McGuinness.

Fictional character biography

Winslow Percival Schott

The Toyman first appeared in 1943 and appeared in several Golden Age Superman stories. Schott appeared less frequently in comics published after the early 1950s, but remained a semi-regular foe during the '60s, '70s, and '80s.

While at first more of a nuisance, the Toyman gradually grew more emotionally unstable and paranoid over time, his toys following suit by becoming a lot more dangerous. Although Winslow Schott in his civilian persona was a rather sweet, humble, quirky (if socially withdrawn) person, as the Toyman he turned into a childish, destructive megalomaniac. During the '70s Winslow was effectively retired from crime, but he kept contact with Superman and even helped out to take down Jack Nimball, who he felt sullied the Toyman legacy.

This retirement proved to be tragically short, as not long after Winslow put some of his toys on display (a suggestion by Superman), the entire museum exhibition was completely wrecked. Sightings reported this to be the work of a man in blue tights flying at great speeds. Thinking he has been played for a fool by Superman, Schott swore to destroy everything Superman cared about to avenge his life's work. Eventually it is revealed that the real culprit was Bizarro, in search of the duplicator ray, but by then it was already too late: Schott had already returned to his Toyman ways, murdered Jack Nimball and a hotel door guard in cold blood, and built a giant robot to terrorize the city. Shortly after his defeat, he regained his sanity and remembered what he had done. He shed tears of regret as he was escorted to the police car.
     
After that incident Winslow's mental state grew even worse, and while he often made several legitimate attempts to atone for his sins, he would often relapse back into madness.

After 1985's miniseries Crisis on Infinite Earths and John Byrne's Man of Steel miniseries, the Toyman's history was revised, and the Post-Crisis version of the character first appeared in Superman (vol. 2) #13 (January 1988). In this version, Winslow Schott is an unemployed British toymaker who blames Lex Luthor and his company, LexCorp, for being fired from the toy company he is working for. He uses his toymaking talents to seek revenge, which eventually causes him to cross paths with the British hero Godiva, and subsequently, Superman himself. The Toyman continues to commit various crimes in Metropolis, including engaging in child abduction.

The Toyman later became a much more sinister figure, shaving his head, wearing black and getting advice in his head from "Mother". This was prompted by him being told that a range of Superman action figures would not include him, as he was not "edgy" enough. While this seems to begin as a pose of what he thought people expect of a villain, it rapidly became a genuine psychotic break. While in this state he abducted and later murdered Adam Morgan, the son of Daily Planet reporter Cat Grant. Adam and several other children captured by the Toyman tried to escape, but Schott found out and stabbed Adam to death for being the leader of the group. This caused Schott to develop a hatred of children, as he blamed them for not appreciating his toys. At the time, Schott showed no remorse for what he had done. When Cat Grant later confronted him in prison he cruelly told her "You were a bad mommy. I'm glad I killed your son."

The Toyman later seemingly recovered, and Superman showed him that children did appreciate old-fashioned toys, arranging parole in an orphanage; it was later revealed, however, that this was all a hallucination caused when Zatanna attempted to cure him and he had, in fact, returned to child abduction. He appeared after JLA: Crisis of Conscience where Zatanna reveals she mind-wiped him. She and Superman go after him. Zatanna is bound and gagged by him, but freed by Superman; however, the Toyman escaped.

Winslow was seen in Lex Luthor: Man of Steel as a criminal released by Lex Luthor's aide Mr. Orr to deploy his genetically engineered hero Hope, but she almost kills the villain, until Superman saved him. The Toyman was in the Infinite Crisis: Villains United special as well, preparing for the Blackgate Prison break by lacing the dinner stew with Venom and Velocity 9 to increase the prisoners' strength, speed, and aggression. Unfortunately, some guards also ate the drugged stew and fought the superheroes who showed up to stop the criminals.

He was later seen as a member of the Injustice League in the Justice League of America Wedding Special.

The Toyman's history was later revised in Action Comics #865, by Geoff Johns and Jesus Merino. Winslow Schott tells Jimmy Olsen that he was a toymaker who lived with his wife Mary. When a businessman offered to buy his shop to expand the number of children his toys can reach, he refused. When Mary was killed in a car accident a few weeks later, Schott agreed to the purchase. However, the businessman lied and gave his technologically advanced toy plans to arms manufacturers. Schott proceeded to bomb the business with an explosive teddy bear. A twist at the end of the story reveals that Mary was just one of his first robotic creations.

Following his first confrontation with Superman, Schott met the Prankster for the first time. The Prankster is a cruel, callous man who commits crimes "because it's fun". He repeatedly asked Schott to "team up", but Schott refused.

Schott reveals to Jimmy that the Toyman who killed Adam Grant was a robot created by Schott to replace him in the event that he was ever incarcerated and that a glitch in the robot's programming resulted in it developing a personality (and later a hatred of children), and that Schott's repeated attempts to contact the robot resulted in it suffering from delusions of "Mother". This was confirmed in Superman Secret Files 2009, although Jimmy initially expressed doubt that Schott was telling the truth.

In the 1997 Speed Force Special, the Max Mercury story Child's Play, set in 19th century New York City, featured the Schott Toy Company run by Archimedes Schott, a crooked businessman who resembles Winslow. Any relationship between them is unknown.

In 2011, "The New 52" rebooted the DC Comics universe. In the Supergirl series while in Arkham Asylum, the Toyman is visited by Cat Grant (whose son Adam was murdered) and Supergirl. Cat interrogates him about children who have been kidnapped with dolls left behind. The Toyman claims he is innocent and the robotic dolls attack him. Supergirl saves him and gets him to medical care. When Cat return home, she is confronted by a villain called the Dollmaker. He identifies himself as Anton Schott implying that he is somehow related to the Toyman. The Dollmaker eventually reveals himself to be the abandoned son of Winslow, who has been kidnapping children and using macabre experiments to turn them into slaves. He tells Cat that he wants her to become his new mother, and that he wishes to serve as a replacement for her murdered son, but Cat violently rejects him. With her gag temporarily removed, Cat is able to call Supergirl for help, and the two are able to defeat the Dollmaker and free the children he had enslaved.

Jack Nimball
In the 1970s, a man named Jack Nimball assumes the identity of the second Toyman during a period in which Schott had retired from his criminal career and first appeared in Action Comics #432 (February 1974). Nimball wore a jester costume and used a similar modus operandi to the original Toyman. However, this version of the Toyman proved short-lived. Schott killed Nimball with a mechanical toy bird and resumed his criminal career in Superman #305 (November 1976). Between those two issues, this Toyman's only other appearances were in Action Comics #454 and Superman #299.

Nimball appears as one of Schott's androids in Action Comics #865.

The version of the Toyman who appears in Challenge of the Super Friends was based on Nimball.

In 2011, Mattel released a DC Universe Classics 6" Toyman figure based on the Jack Nimball version of the character. On the back, though, the character is labeled as Winslow Percival Schott.

Hiro Okamura
 is a teenage mechanical genius from Japan first appearing as the Toyman in Superman (vol. 2) #177 (February 2002) by Jeph Loeb and Ed McGuinness. He shows up in Metropolis in a giant Super Robot fighting Metallo, claiming the cyborg's equally-giant body was based on material stolen from his grandfather.

He later becomes an ally to Superman and Batman. In the Superman/Batman series, he aids the two in destroying a kryptonite meteor that threatens the Earth. He strikes a deal with Batman to provide him with various technological implements. Okamura uses more technologically advanced devices than the traditionally-constructed contrivances Schott uses and his work is largely whimsical in nature. Many of his inventions are inspired by anime and manga, including giant mechas (notably, his giant Composite Batman-Superman robot).

Okamura appears only a few times in the Superman/Batman comic book, and his activities are limited to Japan. Winslow Schott remains active as the Toyman in the United States.  In the Sam Loeb-penned memorial issue Superman/Batman #26, Okamura fakes his own kidnapping at the hands of Schott, forcing Superboy and Robin to search through his complex to save his life. Realizing his loneliness, Superboy and Robin extend their friendship to the boy. Okamura joins Robin and the other Teen Titans at Titans Tower for Superboy's funeral, clutching a Superboy action figure.

In Superman/Batman #45, he offers to assist the duo in their quest to rid the world of kryptonite, using spider-like nanobots to collect kryptonite molecules in the air. His offer becomes a necessity as Lana Lang, in a last-ditch effort to get rid of Kryptonians and keep LexCorp afloat, turns a set of kryptonite caches into "dirty bombs", which irradiate the entire planet. Okamura comes to the rescue, settling for a Power Girl-bot to "date". Instead, he gets his own dream date, a dinner in Paris with the real Karen, and the status of an honorary member of the Justice League.

A future version of Okamura, allied with a power-hungry group of Titans, travels back in time to the modern day to cement their power-base in Teen Titans (vol. 3) #52 (January 2008).

Okamura appears as one of Winslow Schott's androids in Action Comics #865; given the unreliable nature of Schott's narration, Hiro's status as his android creation is suspect.

In 2011, "The New 52" rebooted the DC Comics universe. Hiro Okamura operates as the Toymaster. He and his friend Agnes have reverse-engineered the works of Silas Stone and Professor Emil Hamilton to create a massive multiplayer online role-playing game that puts the players with Batman and Superman in real life. When it comes to the Toymaster's latest game, Jimmy Olsen is one of the players that will partake in the game that will involve the killing of Batman. When Batman and Superman track down the Toymaster, he warns Batman of their weakness of being beaten down in real life while also stating that his game has somehow began to manifest in real life. Before Batman can destroy the console to end the game, the Toymaster's building is then attacked by Mongul, who plans to make the Toymaster's game real for him.

Okamura later appears as a confidant at his Toymaster Gameshop for a witness named Condesa to Clark Kent and Lois Lane's story on HODOR_Root, in which he agrees to help them.

Skills and abilities
The Toyman does not have powers, but he does possess an incredible technological prowess and expertise in robotics, as well as knowledge of biological weaponry. Despite the childish motif which he usually insists on incorporating, his creations are highly sophisticated, destructive, and dangerous. In addition, most of these inventions have an innocuous or even comical appearance that disconcerts his opponents.

The second Toyman possesses skills identical to Winslow Schott.

The heroic Toyman is an excellent engineer, able to fix most machinery (such as giant robots and computer hardware).

Other characters named the Toyman

Toyman robot
The Toyman surfaces in Metropolis and allies with Lex Luthor in Action Comics #837 (May 2006) as part of the One Year Later 'Up, Up, and Away' story arc. His first appearance was written by Geoff Johns and Kurt Busiek with art by Pete Woods.

His appearance, inspired by the character's Superman: The Animated Series incarnation, is that of a child-sized doll. This Toyman mentions meeting Hiro Okamura in Japan and stealing one of his Superman robots. As part of his bargain with Luthor, he is given the information needed to find his creator Winslow Schott in exchange for assistance in a plot against Superman.

This Toyman, renamed the Toyboy, is shown amongst Schott's other robots in Action Comics #865, and appears as the Toyboy alongside Schott in the 2009-2010 World's Finest miniseries.

On the cover of Justice League of America (vol. 2) #13, it shows this android Toyman as a member of the Injustice League.

Toywoman
A female version of the Toyman named the Toywoman appears in Superman #349 (July 1980). The Toywoman is the gender-inverted version of Winslow Schott, the criminal known as the Toyman, created by Mister Mxyzptlk to serve as an enemy to his creation of Superwoman. Once Superman tricked Mister Mxyzptlk into saying his name backwards, the creation of Superwoman and Toywoman were undone.

Bizarro Toyman
The Bizarro Toyman appears in Action Comics #856 (November 2007). When Bizarro III found himself infused with radiation from a blue sun, he developed the ability to replicate himself as well as create other "Bizarro" lifeforms based upon likenesses of people from Earth. He used this power to populate a cube-shaped planetoid dubbed the Bizarro World within the blue sun star-system. One of the many duplicates that he created was a Bizarro version of Superman's adversary Toyman. Bizarro imprisoned Toyman inside of his Fourtriss uv Bizarro along with several other known foes.

Other versions

World's Finest Comics
An unidentified Toyman appears in World's Finest Comics #167 (June, 1967). He tries to start a crime spree in Gotham City, but is thwarted by Superman, Supergirl and Batman. Nevertheless, Toyman uses a prototype molecular-dissolver ray on Batman to injure him.

Titans Tomorrow
An older Hiro Okamura appears in the Titans Tomorrow reality as a member of the Titans Army who utilizes a suit of orange-and-blue manga-themed battle armor.

Whatever Happened to the Man of Tomorrow?
In the story, Whatever Happened to the Man of Tomorrow? by Alan Moore, the Toyman and the Prankster are unwittingly manipulated by Mister Mxyzptlk to discover Superman's secret identity. They succeed after kidnapping Pete Ross and torturing the information out of him, then killing him. After managing to unmask Clark Kent in front of Lana Lang and others by machine-gunning him and revealing his costume beneath his clothes, the Toyman and the Prankster are captured by Superman.

Earth-31
On Earth-31, an elderly Winslow Schott is contacted by the Joker to provide him with dangerous toys, such as exploding dolls.

Justice
The Toyman appears in Justice as a member of the Legion of Doom. This version communicates through a human-sized marionette resembling Jack Nimball, became obese and infected with Brainiac's cybernetics, and is based in a city resembling a funhouse and populated primarily by children and families he has taken hostage.  He attacks Hawkman and Hawkgirl in their museum using toy fighter planes and a gigantic Nimball Marionette, blowing up their museum and leaving the duo for dead, though they survive the attack. When the Justice League storm the Hall of Doom, Toyman uses his marionette and the city's toys to attack them, but they destroy the former before Superman locates Schott. The League save the hostages while Schott recovers in the Batcave.

In other media

Television

Animation
 A variation of the Toyman appears in The New Adventures of Superman. This version is the unnamed son of Winslow Schott.
 The Jack Nimball incarnation of Toyman appears in Challenge of the Super Friends, voiced by Frank Welker. This version is a member of Lex Luthor's Legion of Doom.
 The Toyman was meant to appear in the Super Friends: The Legendary Super Powers Show episode "The Case of the Dreadful Dolls", but was declared off-limits and replaced by series original villain the Dollmaker (not to be confused with the Batman villain of the same name). In a nod to the Toyman however, the Dollmaker's lair is located in Schott's Toymaking Factory.
 An unrelated Toyman resembling Jack Nimball appears in a self-titled episode of The Plastic Man Comedy/Adventure Show, voiced by Alan Oppenheimer. This version possesses a wind-up key on his back.
 A variation of Winslow Schott / Toyman appears in series set in the DC Animated Universe. This version, Winslow Schott Jr., wears a doll's head-like mask, which he is never seen without, and is armed with toy-like weapons. Additionally, he is the son of Winslow Schott Sr., who dreamed of building a toy factory, but lacked capital. Crime boss Bruno Mannheim offered to bankroll him to secretly use the factory as a front for a numbers racket behind his back. When the police discovered the scheme, the gangsters left Schott Sr. to take the fall. As a result, he was falsely imprisoned for 10 years and died in prison before he could be paroled. Meanwhile, Schott Jr. spent several years in abusive and neglectful foster homes, which left him a deranged adult.
 Schott Jr. first appears in Superman: The Animated Series, voiced by Bud Cort. Throughout the episodes "Fun and Games" and "Obsession", he creates a lifelike android named Darci and seeks revenge against Mannheim for wronging his father as well as Superman for foiling his schemes before Schott Jr. and Darci are seemingly killed in the latter episode.
 Schott Jr. resurfaces in the Static Shock episode "Toys in the Hood", voiced again by Bud Cort. Having survived the events of "Obsession", he and Darci turn up in Dakota to capture Static's friend Daisy so they can use her as a model for Darci's new nanite-constructed body. After Superman and Static join forces to confront Schott Jr. and rescue Daisy, Darci betrays him and tries to escape, only to discover that he had implanted a fail-safe device programmed to have the nanites destroy her if she ever did so. Darci melts while Schott Jr. is taken to jail.
 Schott Jr. appears in the Justice League two-part episode "Hereafter", voiced by Corey Burton. He joins the Superman Revenge Squad to fulfill their eponymous goal, only to battle the Justice League. During their fight, he uses an experimental machine resembling a giant toy robot to seemingly kill Superman, though it is later revealed that he had been sent to a post-apocalyptic future before he eventually returns to the present to prevent the catastrophe that caused it.
 Schott Jr. appears in Justice League Unlimited, voiced again by Bud Cort. As of the episode "The Great Brain Robbery", he has become a member of Grodd's Secret Society. Prior to and during the events of the two-part series finale "Alive!" and Destroyer", Lex Luthor takes command of the Society, but Grodd launches a mutiny to take back control. In the ensuing battle, Schott Jr. sides with the former before Darkseid attacks and kills most of the Society. Schott Jr. subsequently joins the survivors in working with the Justice League to foil Darkseid's invasion of Earth.
 The Jack Nimball incarnation of the Toyman makes a cameo appearance in The Batman episode "Lost Heroes" Pt. 1, voiced by Richard Green.
 The Toyman appears in the Batman: The Brave and the Bold episode "Battle of the Superheroes!", voiced by John DiMaggio.
 Additionally, an original villain named Funhaus, based on the Jack Nimball incarnation of the Toyman, appeared as the main foe in the episode "Invasion of the Secret Santas!" and the teaser for "Mayhem of the Music Meister!", voiced by Gary Anthony Williams.
 A younger Toyman based on the Silver Age version makes a cameo appearance in the Young Justice episode "Intervention", voiced by Cameron Bowen.
 A villainous and diminutive version of Hiro Okamura / Toyman appears in Justice League Action, voiced by Ken Jeong.
 The android version of the Toyman makes non-speaking cameo appearances in Harley Quinn. This version is a member of the Legion of Doom.
 A teenage version of Winslow Schott appears in DC Super Hero Girls.
 Toyman appears in Batwheels, voiced by James Arnold Taylor.

Live-action
 A variation of the Toyman named Orlich Hoffman appears in the Wonder Woman episode "The Deadly Toys", portrayed by Frank Gorshin.
 A character based on Toyman called Nick Knack appears in Superboy, portrayed by Gilbert Gottfried. He is an electronics genius who dresses in child-like clothes.
 Elements of the Toyman were featured in Lois & Clark: The New Adventures of Superman:
 A character named Winslow P. Schott appears in the Christmas episode "Seasons Greedings", portrayed by Sherman Hemsley. This version has a similar background to the post-Crisis comics version of Schott and displays a genuine love for kids, which eventually contributes to him turning over a new leaf by the end of the episode.
 A childlike variation of the Toyman named Harold Kripstly appears in the episode "Toy Story", portrayed by Grant Shaud.  He uses a teleportation machine to kidnap children, but accidentally abducts Lois Lane, which leads to Superman foiling Kripstly's scheme.
 The Winslow Schott incarnation of the Toyman appears in Smallville, portrayed by Chris Gauthier. This version is a disfigured, partially crippled toymaker and inventor with a great yet eccentric mind and a penchant for bringing toys to work. He originally worked for S.T.A.R. Labs before he was hired by Oliver Queen to work for Queen Industries, subsequently fired for putting explosives in his toys, and found work with Lex Luthor. In the episode "Requiem", Schott makes several attempts on Queen's life before he is framed by Queen for destroying one of Luthor's mobile bases and becomes a fugitive. In the episode "Echo", Schott is framed for Luthor's apparent death and resurfaces to test Clark Kent and attempt to kill Queen once more with help from an android double of himself, only to be arrested. While in prison, Schott is visited by Tess Mercer, who gives him John Corben's kryptonite-powered heart to study. In the episode "Prophecy", Schott establishes Marionette Ventures, an organization dedicated to controlling Smallville's waterfront properties, despite still being in jail. Following a series of failures however, Kent foils Schott's plans.
 Several variations of the Toyman make several appearances in Supergirl:
 Introduced in the episode "Childish Things", the Winslow Schott incarnation of Toyman (portrayed by Henry Czerny) tried to kill his boss, Chester Dunholz, for supposedly stealing his projects a decade prior to the series, but Dunholz survived while six innocents were killed. After learning what happened, his son Winslow "Winn" Schott Jr. (portrayed by Jeremy Jordan) never forgave him for giving in to his rage. In the present, Schott escapes from prison and forces Winn to help him make another attempt on Dunholz's life before he is ultimately apprehended by Supergirl. As of the episode "Schott Through the Heart", Schott has passed away, but his funeral is disrupted by a bomb in his casket. In the two-part episode "Back from the Future", Winn encounters a digital consciousness based on his father while attempting to stop the digital consciousness of a villainous doppelganger of himself. Winn reluctantly agrees to let Schott help and the latter sacrifices himself to delete the alternate Winn's consciousness.
 "Schott Through the Heart" also introduces a female version of Jack Nimball named Jacqueline Nimball / Toywoman, portrayed by Brooke Smith. Following Schott's death, his protégé Nimball sends flying monkeys into the DEO to target Schott's ex-wife Mary and Winn, though they work with Supergirl to defeat her.
 "Back from the Future" also features an alternate universe version of Winn (also portrayed by Jordan) who took on the mantle of the Toyman following his father's death. After he is freed from a prison transport by Brainiac 5 on Lex Luthor's behalf, this Toyman attempts to frame Winn for terrorism in the future by killing Andrea Rojas with robotic white tigers. While Supergirl and the DEO fight off the tigers, Winn confronts his villainous counterpart before the latter kills himself with a bomb he constructed and uploads himself into the DEO's computers at the last minute to invade the Internet. With help from a digital copy of his father's conscious, Winn hacks the system and deletes both of the Toymen's consciousnesses. As he had joined the Legion by this time, Winn changes his legionnaire codename from "Computer Lad" to "Toyman" in his father's memory and to do good in the "Toyman's" name.

Film
 In the unproduced screenplay for Batman vs. Superman, the Toyman makes a brief appearance as a reformed criminal that Batman interrogates and tortures to locate the Joker. When they are attacked by one of the Joker's deadly gadgets, Batman narrowly escapes, leaving the Toyman to be caught in an explosion. His fate is not revealed in the script.
 The Winslow P. Schott incarnation of the Toyman appears in Superman: Doomsday, voiced by John DiMaggio. This version is more deranged and unkempt than most incarnations and possesses a Goth aesthetic. Following Superman's apparent death while fighting Doomsday, Toyman holds a school bus full of children hostage while robbing a bank until a clone of Superman defeats him. Following this, the latter becomes a fugitive and kills a four-year-old girl off-screen before the police recapture him. Upon hearing the news, the incensed Superman clone takes Toyman into the sky and drops him to his death.
 The Hiro Okamura incarnation of the Toyman appears in Superman/Batman: Public Enemies, voiced by Calvin Tran. This version is said to have an I.Q. of 210 and displays an inappropriate attraction towards Power Girl.
 The Jack Nimball incarnation of the Toyman appears in JLA Adventures: Trapped in Time, voiced by Tom Gibis. This version is a living wooden doll and a member of the Legion of Doom.
 A character based on the Toyman called the Toymaster appears in Justice League vs. Teen Titans, voiced by Steve Blum. He is a member of the Legion of Doom.
 The Jack Nimball incarnation of the Toyman makes a cameo appearance in Justice League Dark: Apokolips War.
 The Winslow Schott incarnation of the Toyman makes a non-speaking appearance in Teen Titans Go! & DC Super Hero Girls: Mayhem in the Multiverse. This version is a member of the Legion of Doom.

Video games
 The Toyman appears in DC Universe Online, voiced by Matt Hislope.
 The Toyman appears as a playable character in Lego Batman 3: Beyond Gotham, voiced by Nolan North.
 The Toyman appears as a playable character in Lego DC Super-Villains, voiced again by Corey Burton.
 The Jack Nimball incarnation of the Toyman appears in DC Super Hero Girls: Teen Power, voiced by Charlie Schlatter.
 The Hiro Okamura incarnation of Toyman is set to appear in Suicide Squad: Kill the Justice League.

Miscellaneous
 The Smallville incarnation of Winslow Schott, as well as Hiro Okamura, appear in Smallville Season 11. After foiling criminals wearing teleportation vests that were stolen in a previous LexCorp robbery, Superman and Lex Luthor reluctantly join forces to solve the mystery. They initially suspect Schott, who is incarcerated at Stryker's Island in "hyper-solitary". Upon being interviewed by Lois Lane about the Prankster, Schott reveals they used to work together at Queen Industries' R&D department before he transferred to LexCorp and Prankster is a cheat who stole his idea for Kryptonite bullets. Additionally, Schott modified John Corben's Kryptonite heart to give him the ability to absorb Kryptonite radiation.
 An unidentified incarnation of the Toyman and Hiro Okamura appear in the Batman: The Brave and the Bold comics.
 The Hiro Okamura incarnation of the Toyman appears in the Catwoman: Queen of Thieves podcast.
 An unidentified incarnation of the Toyman appears in the Robot Chicken DC Comics Special, voiced by Seth Green. This version is a member of the Legion of Doom.
 The Toyman appears in the DC Super Friends tie-in comics.

See also
 List of Superman enemies
 Killer toys

References

External links
 Toyman at DC Database
 Toyman (Schott) at Comic Vine
 Toyman (Nimball) at Comic Vine
 Toymaster at Comic Vine
 Supermanica entry on the pre-Crisis Toyman
 The Toyman at The Superman Super Site

 

Villains in animated television series
Articles about multiple fictional characters
Characters created by Geoff Johns
Characters created by Jeph Loeb
Characters created by Kurt Busiek
Comics characters introduced in 1943
Comics characters introduced in 2003
Comics characters introduced in 2006
DC Comics male superheroes
DC Comics male supervillains
DC Comics orphans
DC Comics robots
DC Comics scientists
Fictional engineers
Fictional English people
Fictional inventors
Fictional jesters
Fictional roboticists
Fictional serial killers
Fictional toymakers and toy inventors
Golden Age supervillains
Japanese superheroes
Superman characters

de:Schurken im Superman-Universum#Toyman